Beverly B. Burnsed Spencer (born October 23, 1941) was Vice President of University Relations (1992–2003) at Florida State University in Tallahassee, Florida.  Her role in the position involved directing the Florida State University Alumni Association and the Seminole Boosters.

Beverly Spencer, formerly Beverly Burnsed, was also a member of the Florida House of Representatives, 1976–1988.  She earned a BA in History from Florida State University in 1962.

References

Sources 
 Exploring FSU's Past: A Public History Project, Fall 2006 

Florida State University alumni
Living people
1941 births
Members of the Florida House of Representatives